Somatina mozambica is a moth of the  family Geometridae. It is found in Mozambique and South Africa.

References

Moths described in 1905
Scopulini